The Heart Punch is a 1932 American pre-Code melodrama film directed by B. Reeves Eason, and starring Lloyd Hughes, Marion Shilling and Mae Busch. It was one of the first films from Mayfair Pictures. The film's sets were designed by the art director Paul Palmentola.

Plot 
A prizefighter named Jimmy Milligan (aka the Cyclone Kid) meets his sweetheart's brother in the ring and accidentally kills him. She forgives him after he promises not to fight again. After his sweetheart goes to jail, however, he is compelled to set up one more fight in order to raise funds for her trial.

Cast 

 Lloyd Hughes as Jimmy Milligan
 Marion Shilling as Kitty Doyle
 George J. Lewis as Lefty Doyle
 Mae Busch as Goldie Zenius
 Wheeler Oakman as Spike Patterson
 Walter Miller as Joe Zenias
 James B. Leong as Wong
 Gordon De Main as 	Defense Attorney Benton
 Hal Price as 	Mr. Webster 
 Edward Peil Sr. as Prosecutor 
 Tammany Young as 	Benny, the Waiter
 Henry Hall as 	Judge
 Kit Guard as 	Man Outside Gym

Reception 
Critics called the film "swell entertainment," lauding the picture for its "two realistic fights."

References

Bibliography
 Pitts, Michael R. Poverty Row Studios, 1929–1940: An Illustrated History of 55 Independent Film Companies, with a Filmography for Each. McFarland & Company, 2005.

Melodrama films
1932 films
American drama films
1932 drama films
American boxing films
American black-and-white films
Films directed by B. Reeves Eason
Mayfair Pictures films
1930s American films